Als die Liebe starb is the fifth studio album from Austrian electronic music band L'Âme Immortelle.

Track listing

Re-release bonus tracks

11. "Why Didn't I Die" 
12. "Just Defy"

References

2003 albums
GUN Records albums